Fogo Island-Cape Freels is a provincial electoral district in Newfoundland and Labrador, which is represented by one member in the Newfoundland and Labrador House of Assembly. It was contested for the first time in the 2015 provincial election.

Members of the House of Assembly
The district has elected the following Members of the House of Assembly:

Election results

References

Newfoundland and Labrador provincial electoral districts